Paralcaligenes ginsengisoli is a Gram-negative, strictly aerobic and motile  bacterium from the genus Paralcaligenes which has been isolated from soil from ginseng field in Yeoncheon County in Korea.

References 

 

Burkholderiales
Bacteria described in 2015